The Castle of Esporão is a medieval castle in the civil parish of Reguengos de Monsaraz, municipality of Reguengos de Monsaraz, district of Évora. 

It is classified by IGESPAR as a Site of Public Interest.

Esporao
Esporao
Castle Esporao